Kindbladochiton is an extinct  of polyplacophoran molluscs. Kindbladochiton became extinct during the Ordovician period.

References 

Prehistoric chiton genera